First Presbyterian Church is a historic church at 600 N. Brittain Street in Shelbyville, Tennessee.

The First Presbyterian congregation was established in 1815. It is affiliated with the Presbyterian Church (USA).

The church's Greek Revival building was completed in 1854 and added to the National Register of Historic Places in 1980. It has been described as one of Tennessee's finest Greek Revival churches.

References

External links
 First Presbyterian Church website

Presbyterian churches in Tennessee
Churches on the National Register of Historic Places in Tennessee
Churches completed in 1854
19th-century Presbyterian church buildings in the United States
Greek Revival church buildings in Tennessee
National Register of Historic Places in Bedford County, Tennessee
Buildings and structures in Shelbyville, Tennessee
1815 establishments in the United States